Intrigo: Samaria is a 2019 German-Swedish-American mystery crime drama film directed by Daniel Alfredson and starring Phoebe Fox, Andrew Buchan and Jeff Fahey. It is the third of a trilogy preceded by Intrigo: Death of an Author (2018) and Intrigo: Dear Agnes (2019).

Plot
While cycling late night, 19-year-old Vera Kall arrives at a farm. She leaves her bike and sneaks quietly in through a kitchen door. She hadn't  had time to realize that she is not alone, when a sudden blow  to the head knocks her onto the kitchen floor where she is left lying. Meanwhile, a successful copywriter at Antwerp, Henry, is approached by Paula, a documentarian, with whom, upon talking, revealed that she once studied with Vera. Her task is to make a film about Vera Kall, and she wants Henry's help in writing a script for it, while she will travel to Münster and start filming. At the same time, Vera's father, Jakob, is convicted in her murder and sent to prison. Paula and Henry team up to unravel the truth and why and where Vera's body disappeared, while at the same time try to hide the whereabouts.

Cast
Phoebe Fox as Paula
Andrew Buchan as Henry
Millie Brady as Vera
Jeff Fahey as Jacob
Jack Brett Anderson as Fritz Neller
Dan Cade as John
Cal MacAninch as Erich Neumann-Hansen
Tracy Wiles as Monica Kall
Ann Firbank as Irma Kuentzer
Skye Hallam as Claire Meitens
Tor Clark as Doris
Angela Kostic as Beatrice Motte
Nick Wilton as Harry Fletcher
Luka Peroš as client
Dan Cade as John
Katerina Tana as Elisa
Josephine Butler as Susanne Liebermann
Bob Goody as Kruggel
Nenad Pavlovic as Kellerman
Jovan Gulan as Pieter Vogel
Marko Gvero as cleaner
Michael Moreland as estate agent
William Dugdale as Stephan
Jaka Petric as Bernt Staaf
Gasper Duhovnik as Kim Larsen
Jaka Dolinar as Chris von Hausswolf
Danijel Simon as Tom Kusoffsky

Reception
Jeffrey M. Anderson of Common Sense Media awarded the film two stars out of five.

References

External links

American mystery drama films
American crime drama films
2019 crime drama films
German mystery drama films
German crime drama films
Swedish crime drama films
English-language German films
English-language Swedish films
Films based on Swedish novels
Films directed by Daniel Alfredson
Lionsgate films
2010s mystery drama films
Swedish mystery drama films
2010s English-language films
2010s American films
2010s German films
2010s Swedish films